The Movie Show is an Australian film review program which was broadcast on SBS TV. Its history is divided into three parts, until it finally wound up in 2008.

History
The original format, which ran from 30 October 1986 to 12 May 2004, had two presenters, David Stratton and Margaret Pomeranz. Stratton and Pomeranz left for the ABC in early 2004, expressing dissatisfaction at high-level decisions at SBS. They soon had a new program with a similar format, At the Movies.

SBS continued The Movie Show, which underwent a style change to become more appealing to youth. Three new presenters were brought in: Megan Spencer, Fenella Kernebone and Jaimie Leonarder. Marc Fennell presented a segment reviewing newly released DVDs. The final episode of The Movie Show aired in 2006.

From 2007 to 2008, The Movie Show returned with a new interactive 10-minute format, presented by Lisa Hensley and Michael Adams.

See also

 List of Australian television series
 List of longest-running Australian television series

References

External links
 Official website
 
The Movie Show at the National Film and Sound Archive

Australian non-fiction television series
Australian community access television shows
1986 Australian television series debuts
1990s Australian television series
2000s Australian television series
English-language television shows
Special Broadcasting Service original programming
Film criticism television series